Dame Denise Rosemarie Lewis  (born 27 August 1972) is a British sports presenter and former track and field athlete, who specialised in the heptathlon. She won the gold medal in the heptathlon at the 2000 Sydney Olympics, was twice Commonwealth Games champion, was the 1998 European Champion and won World Championships silver medals in 1997 and 1999. She was the first European to win the Olympic heptathlon, though Europeans, including Briton Mary Peters, had won the Olympic pentathlon precursor event.

Her personal best score for the heptathlon is 6,831 points, set at the Décastar meeting in 2000. This is a former British record and ranks her third on the all-time British lists behind Katarina Johnson-Thompson and Jessica Ennis-Hill.

Since retiring from athletics, she has undertaken various television and media work and is now a regular athletics pundit for BBC Television, including during London 2012,  Rio 2016 and Tokyo 2020.

Olympic career

2000 Olympics
The first day of the 2000 Summer Olympics heptathlon was 23 September. In the first event, Lewis recorded 13.23 seconds for the 100 metres hurdles to be in second place behind the world champion, Eunice Barber, who had finished in 12.97 seconds. Ghada Shouaa, the 1996 Olympic champion, pulled out after only 20 metres of her heat.

After a poor performance in the high jump of only 1.75 m, some way off her personal best, Lewis was in eighth place, 152 points behind Barber who had increased her lead. In the third event, the shot put, Lewis recorded a distance of 15.55 m, placing her second, 30 points behind Natallia Sazanovich and 45 points ahead of former world champion Sabine Braun. Barber's distance of 11.27 m put her in eighth place.

In the final event of the day, the 200 metres, Lewis recorded a time of 24.34 sec. Sabine Braun's time placed her in sixth position. A strong run by Natalya Roshchupkina moved her from sixth position to second, pushing Lewis into third place.

At the end of the first day, the points scored were:
 Natallia Sazanovich, BLR: 3,903
 Natalya Roshchupkina, RUS: 3,872
 Denise Lewis, GBR: 3,852
 Urszula Włodarczyk, POL: 3,805
 Yelena Prokhorova, RUS: 3,771
 Sabine Braun, GER: 3,770
 Eunice Barber, FRA: 3,707
 Karin Specht-Ertl, GER: 3,697

The first event on the second day was the long jump. Lewis's best jump was 6.48 m, marginally behind Yelena Prokhorova and Sazanovich. Eunice Barber, struggling with injury, withdrew after this event. In event six, the javelin, Lewis achieved a throw of 50.19 m. With her closest rivals some way further back she moved into first place, with Sazanovich 63 points behind in second place and Prokhorova in third a further 83 points behind.

In the final event, the 800 metres, Lewis ran with the lower part of her left leg bandaged due to a calf and Achilles tendon injury, aiming to stay close enough to the race leaders to maintain her points advantage. Prokhorova won the race convincingly and when Lewis crossed the line behind Sazanovich it was not, at first, clear if Lewis's time of 2:16.83 was enough to retain first place. After the individual points had been calculated, it was announced, that Lewis had won with a total of 6,584 points. Prokhorova was second with 6,531 (53 points behind Lewis) and Sazanovich was third with 6,527 (4 points behind Prokhorova).

2004 Olympics
At the 2004 Olympics, Lewis was suffering from a number of injuries and withdrew from the competition after the long jump. Teammate and training partner Kelly Sotherton took bronze.

Statistics

Personal bests

Seasonal bests

International competitions

National titles
AAA Championships
Long jump: 1996, 1998
AAA Indoor Championships
60 m hurdles: 1997
Long jump: 1994, 1995, 1998
Shot put: 2004†

† Lewis was the top placed Briton at the 2004 AAA Indoor shot put behind Sweden's Helena Engman

AAA Junior Championships
Heptathlon (under-17): 1988
Long jump: 1989
British Schools International Match
Long jump: 1988
English Schools Championships
Long jump: 1986 (junior), 1987 (intermediate)

Circuit wins
Décastar: 2000

Honours, awards and recognition
Lewis was appointed Member of the Order of the British Empire (MBE) in the 1999 New Year Honours, Officer of the Order of the British Empire (OBE) in the 2001 New Year Honours and Dame Commander of the Order of the British Empire (DBE) in the 2023 New Year Honours for services to sport.

In 2000, she was also presented with the Freedom of the City of Wolverhampton. In 2010, Lewis was inducted into the Wolverhampton Sporting Hall of Fame, while in 2011, she was then inducted into the England Athletics Hall of Fame. In 2013, Lewis was honoured at the annual Wolverhampton Famous Sons & Daughters Awards ceremony. In 2014, she was presented with an honorary degree from the University of Wolverhampton.

With Dame Kelly Holmes, Christine Ohuruogu and Paula Radcliffe, Lewis enjoys acclamation as one of the  "golden girls" of British athletics and, in 1998 and 2000 has been runner up in the BBC Sports Personality of the Year. In 2003, Lewis was put forward as a candidate in the BBC Midlands great midlander of all-time award but lost out to eventual winner Reginald Mitchell the inventor of the Supermarine Spitfire.

Lewis was voted "Sportswoman of the Year" by the Sports Journalists' Association (SJA) in 1997, 1998 and 2000, a joint-record three times, while also being named as runner up in 1996. She was selected as "Female Athlete of the Year" by the British Athletics Writers' Association (BAWA) four times, in 1996, 1997, 1998, and 2000. Lewis won the Sunday Times "Sportswoman of the Year" a record three times, in 1994, 1998 and 2000.

At the inaugural British Ethnic Diversity Sports Awards (BEDSA) in 2015, Lewis became the first recipient of the Lifetime Achievement Award.

Her British and Commonwealth record of 6831 points was set on 30 July 2000 in Talence, France. As of 2013, she ranks 15th in the Heptathlon all-time list.

In 2002, Lewis' Olympic victory was ranked 90th in Channel 4's 100 Greatest Sporting Moments.

In 2010, Lewis was made a Patron of the Jaguar Academy of Sport.

Outside of her sports achievements, Lewis was included in the 2019 edition of the Powerlist, ranking the 100 most influential Black Britons.

Television career

Punditry and presenting
Since 2009, Lewis has acted as a pundit for BBC Sport's athletics coverage and she has covered major live events including the 2009 World Athletics Championships, 2010 Commonwealth Games, 2012 Summer Olympics, 2014 Commonwealth Games and 2016 Summer Olympics.

On 2 February 2015, Lewis guest hosted an episode of The One Show with Matt Baker.

Lewis has also been a presenter on various non-sports television programmes. In July 2015, Lewis co-hosted Right on the Money, a daytime series, alongside Dominic Littlewood on BBC One. The programme returned for a second series in July 2016. From 22 July 2011, Lewis hosted children's reality television show Camp Orange. She is a presenter of the BBC's Secret Britain (series 3 onwards) which introduces lesser-known aspects of the British countryside.

Strictly Come Dancing

In 2004, Lewis took part in the BBC dancing competition, Strictly Come Dancing. She was partnered with professional dancer Ian Waite and in the first few weeks scored the highest number of points with the judges. She eventually reached the final and was runner-up to actress Jill Halfpenny. After this, Lewis and the two other partners from the final danced at the Royal Variety Performance.

Ten days after competing in the Strictly Come Dancing final, Lewis and Waite competed again in the Strictly Come Dancing Champion of Champions Special, where finalists from the first two series competed against each other. Lewis received the most points from the judges, but again was runner-up to Halfpenny.  She then appeared on the 2016 Strictly Come Dancing Christmas Special, partnered with Anton du Beke.

The Masked Dancer

In October 2022, Lewis was unmasked in series 2 of The Masked Dancer as Sea Slug.

TV guest appearances
 Let's Dance for Comic Relief (2009)
 All Star Family Fortunes (2009)
 Pointless with her father-in-law, Tom O'Connor (2011)
 The Cube on ITV (2012)
 Your Face Sounds Familiar (2013)
 Big Star's Little Star with her son Ryan (2014)
 Give a Pet a Home a series which worked alongside the RSPCA in Birmingham (2015)
 Sport Relief in a sketch with Idris Elba playing Luther (2016)
 The Chase: Celebrity Special (2017)
 Hairy Bikers Home for Christmas (2017)
 All Star Musicals (2017)
 Would I Lie to You (2018)

Personal life
Born on 27 August 1972 in West Bromwich to Jamaican-born parents, Lewis grew up in Pendeford, Wolverhampton and was educated at the Regis School in Tettenhall, later to become the King's School. A £1 million sports hall was later built there and named in her honour.

Lewis was in a relationship with Belgian sprinter Patrick Stevens from the late 1990s until 2005. From that relationship, Lewis had a daughter. In 2006, Lewis married Steve Finan O'Connor, former manager of the UK pop group All Saints, current manager of Liam Payne and son of comedian Tom O'Connor. They have three sons.

See also
List of Olympic medalists in athletics (women)
List of World Athletics Championships medalists (women)
List of Commonwealth Games medallists in athletics (women)  
List of European Athletics Championships medalists (women)
List of 1996 Summer Olympics medal winners
List of 2000 Summer Olympics medal winners
List of high jump national champions (women)
List of people from Wolverhampton
British African-Caribbean people
Great Britain and Northern Ireland at the World Athletics Championships
List of celebrities appearing on Daily Cooks Challenge

References

External links

Homepage of Birchfield Harriers. Accessed 30 December 2022.
Biography, ukathletics.net. Accessed 30 December 2022.
UKA Hall of Fame Profile, uka.org.uk. Accessed 30 December 2022.

1972 births
Living people
Sportspeople from Wolverhampton
English heptathletes
British heptathletes
British female athletes
English female athletes
English Olympic medallists
Olympic athletes of Great Britain
Olympic gold medallists for Great Britain
Olympic bronze medallists for Great Britain
Olympic gold medalists in athletics (track and field)
Olympic bronze medalists in athletics (track and field)
Athletes (track and field) at the 1996 Summer Olympics
Athletes (track and field) at the 2000 Summer Olympics
Athletes (track and field) at the 2004 Summer Olympics
Medalists at the 1996 Summer Olympics
Medalists at the 2000 Summer Olympics
Commonwealth Games medallists in athletics
Commonwealth Games gold medallists for England
Athletes (track and field) at the 1994 Commonwealth Games
Athletes (track and field) at the 1998 Commonwealth Games
World Athletics Championships athletes for Great Britain
World Athletics Championships medalists
European Athletics Championships medalists
Birchfield Harriers
Dames Commander of the Order of the British Empire
Black British sportswomen
English people of Jamaican descent
The Sunday Times Sportswoman of the Year winners
Medallists at the 1994 Commonwealth Games
Medallists at the 1998 Commonwealth Games